The 1875 college football season had no clear-cut champion, with the Official NCAA Division I Football Records Book listing Columbia, Harvard, and Princeton as having been selected national champions. Only Princeton claims a national championship for this season.

Conference standings

References